Zinovyevo is a rural locality (a selo) in Razdolyevskoye Rural Settlement, Kolchuginsky District, Vladimir Oblast, Russia. The population was 93 as of 2010. There are 6 streets.

Geography 
Zinovyevo is located 27 km south of Kolchugino (the district's administrative centre) by road. Safonovo is the nearest rural locality.

References 

Rural localities in Kolchuginsky District